The 2001–02 Eintracht Frankfurt season was the 102nd season in the club's football history. In 2001–02 the club played in the 2. Bundesliga, the second tier of German football. It was the club's 3rd season  in the 2. Bundesliga after being relegated from the Bundesliga for the second time.

Results

Friendlies

Indoor soccer tournaments

Riesa

Münster

Competitions

2. Bundesliga

League table

Results summary

Results by round

Matches

DFB-Pokal

Players

First-team squad
Squad at end of season

Left club during season

Eintracht Frankfurt II

Under-19s

Under-17s

Statistics

Appearances and goals

|}

Transfers

Summer

In:

Out:

Winter

In:

Out:

Notes

References

Sources

External links
 Official English Eintracht website 
 German archive site
 2001–02 Bundesliga season at Fussballdaten.de 

2001-02
German football clubs 2001–02 season